The Floyd Cotton Gin is a historic cotton gin at the junction of Arkansas Highway 31 and Arkansas Highway 305 in Floyd, Arkansas, USA. It is a two-story wood-frame building roughly L-shaped with a single-story section extending its southern end and a two-story section projecting east under a continuation of the sloping gabled roof. This gin was built in the 1930s, when White County was one of the nation's leading producers of cotton. It is one of five gins in the county to survive from that period. In early 2022, the cotton gin was torn down for unknown reasons.

The gin was listed on the National Register of Historic Places in 1992.

See also
National Register of Historic Places listings in White County, Arkansas

References

Agricultural buildings and structures on the National Register of Historic Places in Arkansas
Cotton gin
Industrial buildings completed in 1932
National Register of Historic Places in White County, Arkansas
1932 establishments in Arkansas
Demolished buildings and structures in Arkansas
Industrial buildings and structures on the National Register of Historic Places in Arkansas
Cotton industry in the United States